Thyrosticta contigua is a species of moth in the subfamily Arctiinae. It is native to Madagascar.

Its frontwings are black-brownish with 5 yellow spots, the wingspan is 26 mm.

References

 

Arctiinae
Moths described in 1884
Moths of Madagascar
Moths of Africa